Neotheropoda (meaning "new theropods") is a clade that includes coelophysoids and more advanced theropod dinosaurs, and is the only group of theropods that survived the Triassic–Jurassic extinction event. All neotheropods became extinct by the end of the Early Jurassic     (Pliensbachian) period except for Averostra.

Classification
Neotheropoda was named by Robert T. Bakker in 1986 as a group including the relatively derived theropod subgroups Ceratosauria and Tetanurae, and excluding coelophysoids. However, most later researchers have used it to denote a broader group. Neotheropoda was first defined as a clade by Paul Sereno in 1998 as Coelophysis plus modern birds, which includes almost all theropods except the most primitive species. Dilophosauridae was formerly considered a small clade within Neotheropoda, but was later considered to be paraphyletic.

The following family tree illustrates a synthesis of the relationships of the early theropod groups compiled by Hendrickx et al. in 2015.

This second cladogram is based on the redescription of Dilophosaurus by Marsh and Rowe (2020).

This third cladogram is based on the larger analysis in the description of Pendraig milnerae by Spiekman et al. 2021:

References

Late Triassic first appearances
Taxa named by Robert T. Bakker